Cotul Morii is a commune in Hînceşti District, Moldova. It is composed of two villages, Cotul Morii and Sărăteni.

References

Communes of Hîncești District